The 2019 Fordham Rams football team represents Fordham University in the 2019 NCAA Division I FCS football season. They are led by second-year head coach Joe Conlin and play their home games at Coffey Field as a member of the Patriot League.

Previous season
The Rams finished the 2018 season 2–9, 2–4 in Patriot League play to finish in a three-way tie for fourth place.

Preseason

Preseason coaches' poll
The Patriot League released their preseason coaches' poll on July 30, 2019 (voting was by conference head coaches and sports information directors). The Rams were picked to finish in fourth place.

Preseason All-Patriot League team
The Rams had two players selected to the preseason All-Patriot League team.

Defense

Glenn Cunningham – LB

Jesse Bramble – DB

Schedule

Source:

Game summaries

Central Connecticut

at Ball State

at Bryant

at Stony Brook

Richmond

at Yale

at Georgetown

Lehigh

at Lafayette

at Colgate

Holy Cross

Bucknell

References

Fordham
Fordham Rams football seasons
Fordham Rams football